The 1926 South Dakota Coyotes football team was an American football team that represented the University of South Dakota in the North Central Conference (NCC) during the 1926 college football season. In its fourth season under head coach Stub Allison, the team compiled a 5–3–1 record (3–1–1 against NCC opponents), finished in second place out of eight teams in the NCC, and outscored opponents by a total of 90 to 76.

Schedule

References

South Dakota
South Dakota Coyotes football seasons
South Dakota Coyotes football